Sibuguey is a dialect of Pangutaran Sama, a language spoken in the Philippines. It has 500 speakers.

It is spoken in Kulasihan River on the eastern side of Sibuguey Bay between Olutanga Island and the head of the bay.

References

Languages of the Philippines
Dialects